Blake's 7 is a British science fiction television series that was created by Terry Nation and produced by the British Broadcasting Corporation (BBC). Four series were produced between 2 January 1978 and 21 December 1981, all of which have been released on VHS and Region 2 DVD. From September 2021 to June 2022, Forces TV began airing repeats of all 52 episodes of Blake’s 7 for the first time, this followed with a weekly re-run by GBTV from January 2022.

The following cast members made regular appearances in Blake’s 7: Gareth Thomas (Roj Blake), Sally Knyvette (Jenna Stannis), Paul Darrow (Kerr Avon), Michael Keating (Vila Restal), David Jackson (Olag Gan), Jan Chappell (Cally), Jacqueline Pearce (Servalan), Peter Tuddenham (Zen, Orac and Slave), Stephen Greif (Travis I), Brian Croucher (Travis II), Josette Simon (Dayna Mellanby), Steven Pacey (Del Tarrant) and Glynis Barber (Soolin).

Series overview

Episodes

Series 1 (1978)
Series 1 aired on BBC1, Mondays, mostly 7:15 p.m., 2 January 1978 to 27 March 1978, Producer: David Maloney. It averaged 9.22 million viewers on original airing in the UK, with an average chart position of 45.

Series 2 (1979)
Series 2 aired on BBC1, Tuesdays, mostly 7:20 p.m., 9 January 1979 to 3 April 1979. Producer: David Maloney. It averaged 7.14 million viewers on original airing in the UK, with an average chart position of 79, a drop of over two million viewers on that of Series A.

Series 3 (1980)
Series 3 aired on BBC1, Mondays, mostly 7:15 p.m., 7 January 1980 to 31 March 1980. Producer: David Maloney. It averaged 9.45 million viewers on original airing in the UK, with an average chart position of 32, the highest rated series.

Series 4 (1981)
Series 4 aired on BBC1, Mondays, mostly 7:15 p.m., 28 September 1981 to 21 December 1981. Producer: Vere Lorrimer. It averaged 8.49 million viewers on original airing in the UK, with an average chart position of 74, a drop of about a million viewers on that of Series 3, and a chart position on par with that of Series 2. All 13 episodes were repeated on BBC1, Saturdays, mostly 5:25 p.m., 4 June to 27 August 1983.

References

See also
History of Blake's 7

Blake's 7
Blake's 7